In politics, a dog whistle is the use of coded or suggestive language in political messaging to garner support from a particular group without provoking opposition. The concept is named after ultrasonic dog whistles, which are audible to dogs but not humans. Dog whistles use language that appears normal to the majority but communicates specific things to intended audiences. They are generally used to convey messages on issues likely to provoke controversy without attracting negative attention.

Origin and meaning
According to William Safire, the term "dog whistle" in reference to politics may have been derived from its use in the field of opinion polling. Safire quotes Richard Morin, director of polling for The Washington Post, as writing in 1988: subtle changes in question-wording sometimes produce remarkably different results ... researchers call this the "Dog Whistle Effect": Respondents hear something in the question that researchers do not.This essentially conveys that for a political statement to be considered a Dog Whistle it needs to have multiple, genuine interpretations and not just coded language.

He speculates that campaign workers adapted the phrase from political pollsters.

In her 2006 book, Voting for Jesus: Christianity and Politics in Australia, academic Amanda Lohrey writes that the goal of the dog-whistle is to appeal to the greatest possible number of electors while alienating the smallest possible number. She uses as an example politicians choosing broadly appealing words such as "family values", which have extra resonance for Christians, while avoiding overt Christian moralizing that might be a turn-off for non-Christian voters.

Australian political theorist Robert E. Goodin argues that the problem with dog-whistling is that it undermines democracy, because if voters have different understandings of what they were supporting during a campaign, the fact that they were seeming to support the same thing is "democratically meaningless" and does not give the dog-whistler a policy mandate.

The political meaning of dog whistle may cause confusion as they are suposed to be undetecable to the majority. Merrium Webster makes the distinction clear of what is and what is not a dog whistle by explaining that:

"saying that speech is like a dog-whistle (which is a simile) is not quite the same as saying that it is a dog whistle (which is a metaphor"

This essentially conveys that for a political statement to be considered a Dog Whistle it needs to have multiple, genuine interpretations and not just coded language.

Dog whistling, especially in United States, is closely tied with race and perpetuating discrimination in modern American politics.

"Dog whistle politics works by deploying coded language that superficially appears race-neutral, but is intended to communicate a message understood by a particular racial group"

History and usage

Australia
The term was first picked up in Australian politics in the mid-1990s, and was frequently applied to the political campaigning of John Howard. Throughout his 11 years as Australian prime minister and particularly in his fourth term, Howard was accused of communicating messages appealing to anxious Australian voters using code words such as "un-Australian", "mainstream", and "illegals".

One notable example was the Howard government's message on refugee arrivals. His government's tough stance on immigration was popular with voters, but was accused of using the issue to additionally send veiled messages of support to voters with racist leanings, while maintaining plausible deniability by avoiding overtly racist language. Another example was the publicity of the Australian citizenship test in 2007. It has been argued that the test may appear reasonable at face value, but is really intended to appeal to those opposing immigration from particular geographic regions.

Canada

During the 2015 Canadian federal election, the Conservative party led by incumbent Prime Minister Stephen Harper was accused of communicating "code" words in a debate to appeal to his party's base supporters. Midway through the election campaign the Conservative Party hired Australian political strategist Lynton Crosby as a political adviser when they fell to third place in the polls behind the Liberal Party and the New Democratic Party. During a televised election debate Stephen Harper, while discussing the government's controversial decision to remove certain immigrants and refugee claimants from accessing Canada's health care system made reference to "Old Stock Canadians" as being in support of the government's position. Opposition leaders, including former Quebec Liberal MP Marlene Jennings, called his words racist and divisive, as they are used to exclude Canadians of colour.

United Kingdom
Lynton Crosby, who had previously managed John Howard's four election campaigns in Australia, worked as a Conservative Party adviser during the 2005 UK general election, and the term was introduced to British political discussion at this time. In what Goodin calls "the classic case" of dog-whistling, Crosby created a campaign for the Conservatives with the slogan "Are you thinking what we're thinking?": a series of posters, billboards, TV commercials and direct mail pieces with messages like "It's not racist to impose limits on immigration" and "how would you feel if a bloke on early release attacked your daughter?" focused on controversial issues like insanitary hospitals, land grabs by squatters and restraints on police behaviour.

Labour MP Diane Abbott described the 2013 "Go Home" vans advertising campaign by the British Home Office as an example of dog-whistle politics.

In April 2016, Mayor of London and Conservative MP Boris Johnson was accused of "dog whistle racism" by Shadow Chancellor of the Exchequer and Labour MP John McDonnell when Johnson suggested U.S. President Barack Obama held a grudge against the United Kingdom due to his "ancestral dislike of the British Empire" as a result of his "part-Kenyan" heritage, after Obama expressed his support for the UK to vote to remain in the European Union ahead of the UK's referendum on EU membership.

In the 2016 London Mayoral Election, Conservative candidate Zac Goldsmith was accused of running a dog-whistle campaign against Labour's Sadiq Khan, playing on Khan's Muslim faith by suggesting he would target Hindus and Sikhs with a "jewellery tax" and attempting to link him to extremists.

Theresa May was accused of dog-whistle politics during the run up to the UK leaving the European Union, after claiming EU citizens were "jumping the queue".

The Labour Party under Jeremy Corbyn was accused of tolerating "dog-whistle" antisemitism in the party during his time as leader of the party. The 28 Conservative MPs who signed a letter to the National Trust accusing them of "Cultural Marxism" have also been accused of dog-whistling of anti-semitism, as this term is a revival of a Nazi-era term "Cultural Bolshevism" used often by the hard-right.

United States

20th century 
The phrase "states' rights", literally referring to powers of individual state governments in the United States, was described in 2007 by David Greenberg in Slate as "code words" for institutionalized segregation and racism. States' rights was the banner under which groups like the Defenders of State Sovereignty and Individual Liberties argued in 1955 against school desegregation.  In 1981, former Republican Party strategist Lee Atwater, when giving an anonymous interview discussing former president Richard Nixon's Southern strategy, speculated that terms like "states' rights" were used for dog-whistling:

Atwater was contrasting this with then-President Ronald Reagan's campaign, which he felt "was devoid of any kind of racism, any kind of reference". However, Ian Haney López, an American law professor and author of the 2014 book Dog Whistle Politics, described Reagan as "blowing a dog whistle" when the candidate told stories about "Cadillac-driving 'welfare queens' and 'strapping young bucks' buying T-bone steaks with food stamps" while he was campaigning for the presidency. He argues that such rhetoric pushes middle-class white Americans to vote against their economic self-interest in order to punish "undeserving minorities" who, they believe, are receiving too much public assistance at their expense. According to López, conservative middle-class whites, convinced by powerful economic interests that minorities are the enemy, supported politicians who promised to curb illegal immigration and crack down on crime but inadvertently also voted for policies that favor the extremely rich, such as slashing taxes for top income brackets, giving corporations more regulatory control over industry and financial markets, union busting, cutting pensions for future public employees, reducing funding for public schools, and retrenching the social welfare state. He argues that these same voters cannot link rising inequality which has affected their lives to the policy agendas they support, which resulted in a massive transfer of wealth to the top 1% of the population since the 1980s.

In the US the phrase "international bankers" is a well-known dog whistle code for Jews. Its use as such is derived from the anti-Semitic forgery The Protocols of the Elders of Zion. It was frequently used by the fascist-supporting radio personality Charles Coughlin on his national show. His repeated use of the term was a factor in the distributor CBS opting not to renew his contract.

21st century 
Journalist Craig Unger wrote that President George W. Bush and Karl Rove used coded "dog-whistle" language in political campaigning, delivering one message to the overall electorate while at the same time delivering quite a different message to a targeted evangelical Christian political base. William Safire, in Safire's Political Dictionary, offered the example of Bush's criticism during the 2004 presidential campaign of the U.S. Supreme Court's 1857 Dred Scott decision denying the U.S. citizenship of any African American. To most listeners the criticism seemed innocuous, Safire wrote, but "sharp-eared observers" understood the remark to be a pointed reminder that Supreme Court decisions can be reversed, and a signal that, if re-elected, Bush might nominate to the Supreme Court a justice who would overturn Roe v. Wade. This view is echoed in a 2004 Los Angeles Times article by Peter Wallsten.

During Obama's campaign and presidency, a number of left-wing commentators described various statements about Obama as racist dog-whistles. During the 2008 Democratic primaries, writer Enid Lynette Logan criticized Hillary Clinton's campaign's reliance on code words and innuendo seemingly designed to frame Barack Obama's race as problematic, saying Obama was characterized by the Clinton campaign and its prominent supporters as anti-white due to his association with Rev. Jeremiah Wright, as able to attract only black votes, as anti-patriotic, a drug user, possibly a drug seller, and married to an angry, ungrateful black woman. A light-hearted 2008 article by Amy Chozick in The Wall Street Journal questioned whether Obama was too thin to be elected president, given the average weight of Americans; commentator Timothy Noah wrote that this was a racist dog-whistle, because "When white people are invited to think about Obama's physical appearance, the principal attribute they're likely to dwell on is his dark skin." In a 2010 speech, Sarah Palin criticized Obama, saying "we need a commander in chief, not a professor of law standing at the lectern". Harvard professor (and Obama ally) Charles Ogletree called this attack racist, because the true idea being communicated was "that he's not one of us". MSNBC commentator Lawrence O'Donnell called a 2012 speech by Mitch McConnell, in which McConnell criticized Obama for playing too much golf, a racist dog-whistle because O'Donnell felt it was meant to remind listeners of black golfer Tiger Woods, who at the time was going through an infidelity scandal.

In 2012, Obama's campaign ran an ad in Ohio that said Mitt Romney was "not one of us". The Washington Post journalist Karen Tumulty wrote: "ironically, it echoes a slogan that has been used as a racial code over at least the past half-century".

During the 2016 presidential election campaign and on a number of occasions throughout his presidency, Donald Trump was accused of using racial and antisemitic "dog whistling" techniques by politicians and major news outlets. New York Times columnist Ross Douthat remarked that the Trump campaign slogan, "Make America Great Again", "can be read as a dog whistle" to some whiter and more Anglo-Saxon past".

Another example of Trump's alleged dog whistling can be seen in his frequent use of the slogan, "America First" in his presidential campaign and presidency. Those words have a complex history in American politics which includes both use by the anti-Black Ku Klux Klan and by the isolationist America First Committee with its undertones of antisemitism in its campaign to keep the United States out of World War II. Thus, whether Trump realized it or not, the words recalled dark meanings.

During the 2018 gubernatorial race in Florida, Ron DeSantis came under criticism for comments that were allegedly racist, saying: "The last thing we need to do is to monkey this up by trying to embrace a socialist agenda with huge tax increases and bankrupting the state. That is not going to work. That's not going to be good for Florida." DeSantis was accused of using the verb "monkey" as a racist dog whistle; his opponent, Andrew Gillum, was African-American. DeSantis denied that his comment was meant to be racially charged.

Italy 
Roberto Saviano of The Guardian claimed that Italian right-wing politician Giorgia Meloni used the Mussolini-era slogan "God, homeland, family" as a dog-whistle to signal her anti-immigration stance, and in 2019, she used her identity as a dog whistle, proclaiming at a rally: "I am Giorgia, I am a woman, I am a mother, I am Italian, I am a Christian." Washington Post columnist Philip Bump contended  that Meloni has used the term "financial speculators" as a dog-whistle to conceal antisemitism.

Criticism 
Some have argued that it is difficult to tell whether purported dog whistles are in fact dog whistles. Robert Henderson and Elin McCready argue that plausible deniability is a key characteristic of dog whistles. Mark Liberman has argued that it is common for speech and writing to convey messages that will only be picked up on by part of the audience, but that this does not usually mean that the speaker is deliberately conveying a double message. Steven Pinker has argued that the concept of dog whistling allows people to "claim that anyone says anything because you can easily hear the alleged dogwhistles that aren't in the actual literal contents of what the person says".

See also

 
  ('Pavlovian response')

References

Citations

General and cited references 
 
Stephens-Dougan, LaFleur. 2020. Race to the Bottom: How Racial Appeals Work in American Politics. University of Chicago Press.

Further reading 
 Stephens-Dougan, LaFleur (2021). "The Persistence of Racial Cues and Appeals in American Elections". Annual Review of Political Science 24(1).
 
 
 

Political campaign techniques
Political communication
Propaganda techniques